René de Saussure (17 March 1868 – 2 December 1943) was a Swiss Esperantist and professional mathematician (he defended a doctoral thesis on a subject in geometry at the Johns Hopkins University in 1895 and until 1899 he was professor at the Catholic University of America in Washington D.C. and later in Geneva and Berne), who composed important works about Esperanto and interlinguistics from a linguistic viewpoint. He was born in Geneva, Switzerland. His chef d'oeuvre is an analysis on the logic of word construction in Esperanto, Fundamentaj reguloj de la vortteorio en Esperanto ("Fundamental rules of word theory in Esperanto"), defending the language against several Idist critiques. He developed the concept of neceso kaj sufiĉo ("necessity and sufficience") by which he opposed the criticism of Louis Couturat that Esperanto lacks recursion. 

In 1907, de Saussure proposed the international currency spesmilo (₷). It was used by the Ĉekbanko esperantista and other British and Swiss banks until the First World War.

Beginning in 1919, de Saussure proposed a series of Esperanto reforms, and in 1925, he renounced Esperanto in favor of his language Esperanto II. He later became a consultant for the International Auxiliary Language Association, the linguistic research body that standardized and presented Interlingua. He died on 2 December 1943 in Berne, Switzerland.

René was the brother of the linguist Ferdinand de Saussure and the scholar of ancient Chinese astronomy, Léopold de Saussure. His father was the scientist, Henri Louis Frédéric de Saussure.

A new silver Esperanto coin for 100 Steloj was struck in 2018 for the 150th birthday of René de Saussure.

References 

1868 births
1943 deaths
Swiss Esperantists
Swiss mathematicians
Morphologists
Writers from Geneva